Prostanthera patens is a species of flowering plant in the family Lamiaceae and is endemic to Western Australia. It is a small shrub with stiff, spine-like, hairy branches, egg-shaped to broadly elliptic, hairy leaves and red and orange to pale red flowers.

Description
Flowering occurs from August to October.

Taxonomy
Prostanthera patens was first formally described in 1984 by Barry Conn in the Journal of the Adelaide Botanic Garden from specimens collected in 1975 near Pindar.

Distribution and habitat
This mintbush grows in rocky places near granite and ironstone in the Avon Wheatbelt, Murchison and Yalgoo biogeographic regions.

Conservation status
Prostanthera patens is classified as "not threatened" by the Government of Western Australia Department of Parks and Wildlife.

References

patens
Flora of Western Australia
Lamiales of Australia
Taxa named by Barry John Conn
Plants described in 1984